The Pavilion of Prince Teng is a building in the North West of the city of Nanchang, in Jiangxi province, China, on the east bank of the Gan River and is one of the Three Great Towers of southern China. The other two are the Yueyang Tower and the Yellow Crane Pavilion. It has been destroyed and rebuilt many times over its history. The present building was rebuilt in 1989 on the original site. The rebuilding plan was devised by the architect Liang Sicheng, and now the Pavilion of Prince Teng is the landmark of Nanchang. There are nine floors in total. The main architectural structure is in Song dynasty wooden style, showing the magnificence of the Pavilion.

History

The Pavilion of Prince Teng was first built in 653 AD, by Li Yuanying, the younger brother of Emperor Taizong of Tang and uncle of Emperor Gaozong of Tang. Li Yuanying was enfeoffed as Prince Teng in 639 and spent his early years in Suzhou. In 652 he was assigned the governorship of Nanchang where the pavilion served as his townhouse. The Pavilion of Prince Teng is the only existing royal architecture in southern China. Twenty years later, the building was rebuilt by the new governor. Upon its completion, a group of local intelligentsia gathered to compose prose and poetry about the building. The most famous of these is the Preface to the Pavilion of Prince Teng by Wang Bo. This piece made the Pavilion of Prince Teng a household name in China down to the present day.

The Pavilion was subsequently destroyed and rebuilt a total of 29 times over the next centuries. The building itself changed shape and function many times. The penultimate construction was during the Tongzhi era of the Qing Dynasty. That building was destroyed in October 1926 during the chaotic Warlord Era.

Recent

The present Pavilion of Prince Teng was built according to the design of architect Liang Sicheng, and was completed on 8 October 1989; now a landmark of Nanchang. The building is of reinforced concrete, but decorated in Song Dynasty style.

A stainless steel tablet at the entrance is engraved with a calligraphy work of Mao Zedong: 「」 ("Falling snow and lone goose flying together; a single hue, autumn water and the long stretch of sky."), a quotation from Preface to the Pavilion of Prince Teng.

The beautiful garden which is built in 1989 is the perfect ornament of the Pavilion. The building mainly serves tourism purposes. Apart from internal decoration, attractions include a theater that stages performances of period music, and displays of reconstructed ancient instruments. There are some restaurants and souvenir shops. The streets around the pavilion have been designed to conform with its style. This area has become the epicenter of Nanchang's antiques trade.

Influences
The Pavilion of Prince Teng achieved national fame through the Preface to the Pavilion of Prince Teng. As a result, it was endowed by later generations with almost legendary status as an example of magnificent architecture. When the Forbidden City was built, its corner towers were built to imitate the Pavilion of Prince Teng and the Yellow Crane Pavilion as depicted in Song Dynasty paintings. (Strangely, both pavilions are depicted identically in surviving paintings). These uniquely structured corner towers remain some of the most valued architectural treasures of the Forbidden City. The Pavilion of Prince Teng was regarded as the holy land in several dynasties in the history of China. In the meantime, it is the ancient library as well, storing a large number of precious scriptures and poems.

Construction timeline 
According to Wang:

Gallery

See also

Four Great Towers of China
Yellow Crane Tower
Yueyang Tower
Penglai Pagoda

Notes

References 

Wang, Qiaolin et al. 1996. Jiangnan Famous Site: The Pavilion of Prince Teng. Baihuazhou Literary Press. 247 pages. .

Buildings and structures in Jiangxi
Pagodas in China
Song dynasty architecture
Towers in China
Wooden buildings and structures in China
Buildings and structures completed in 653
Towers completed in the 7th century
Rebuilt buildings and structures in China
Tourist attractions in Jiangxi
Traditional Chinese architecture